The 2022 NBBF Premier League was the 21st season of the Nigerian Premier League, the top division of professional basketball in Nigeria. After the 2021 season was organised by the Nigerian Ministry of Youth and Sports, the organisation returned to the Nigeria Basketball Federation (NBBF) this season.

Rivers Hoopers were the defending champions, however, they were eliminated in the semi-finals. Kwara Falcons won their first-ever national championship and qualified directly for the 2023 BAL season. Dada Samuel, still a high school student, was named MVP during his first appearance in the Final 8.

Final 8 
The Final 8 was held from 7 November to 12 November 2022 in the Indoor Hall of the National Stadium of Lagos.

Standings

Atlantic Conference

Savannah Conference

Games 
Each team played four games over a four-day stretch from 7 November to 10 November.

Final round

Semi-finals

Final

References 

2021–22 in Nigerian basketball
2022–23 in basketball leagues